Kara Thevenot (born December 4, 1988 as Kara Kilden) is a Canadian curler from Prince Albert, Saskatchewan. She currently plays lead on Team Robyn Silvernagle.

Career
Thevenot joined the Robyn Silvernagle rink in 2015. Before joining, she played with skips Samantha Yachiw, Brandee Borne and Nancy Martin. In their first season together, the new team found some success winning the qualifier and coming third overall in the 2016 Saskatchewan Scotties Tournament of Hearts. The next year, Thevenot's team lost the final of the 2017 Saskatchewan Scotties Tournament of Hearts to Penny Barker. After winning the 2017 Boundary Ford Curling Classic, The Silvernagle rink once again lost the Saskatchewan Scotties final, this time in an extra end against Sherry Anderson.

For the 2018–19 curling season, Thevenot and Silvernagle added veteran third Stefanie Lawton and second Jessie Hunkin to their team. Silvernagle's team had a strong start to the season, winning the 2018 Red Deer Curling Classic and Saskatchewan Women's Curling Tour events in Humboldt and Saskatoon. With the 2019 Canadian Open being held in North Battleford, her rink qualified for her first Grand Slam event as the sponsor's exemption. Her team qualified for the playoffs with a 3–1 record in the triple knockout format, before losing to Silvana Tirinzoni in the quarterfinal.

After losing the final twice, Team Silvernagle won the 2019 Saskatchewan Scotties Tournament of Hearts with a steal in the final end against Sherry Anderson, her first provincial title. Representing Saskatchewan at the 2019 Scotties Tournament of Hearts, the team went 8–3 in the round robin and championship pools, before eventually losing the semi-final to Ontario and winning the bronze medal. The rink had semi-final finish at the 2019 Players' Championship and a quarterfinal finish at the 2019 Champions Cup to finish off their season.

Team Silvernagle missed the playoffs in the first two Slams of the 2019–20 season, the Masters and the Tour Challenge. She also competed in her first Canada Cup where her team finished with a 1–5 record. They defended their provincial title at the 2020 Saskatchewan Scotties Tournament of Hearts when they once again bested Sherry Anderson in the final. At the 2020 Scotties Tournament of Hearts, Team Silvernagle led Saskatchewan to a 6–5 record, finishing in fifth. It would be the team's last event of the season as both the Players' Championship and the Champions Cup Grand Slam events were cancelled due to the COVID-19 pandemic. On March 11, 2020, it was announced that Team Silvernagle would be parting ways with Thevenot.

Personal life
Thevenot works as a sales agronomist with Lake County Co-op. She is married and has two children.

Teams

References

External links

1988 births
Living people
Canadian women curlers
Sportspeople from Prince Albert, Saskatchewan
Curlers from Saskatoon
Canada Cup (curling) participants